Colin Benders (born 5 December 1986 in Utrecht) is a Dutch techno artist.
He is also the founding figure of The Kyteman Orchestra.

Childhood 

Benders grew up in Sterrenwijk, Utrecht. Primary school was not easy for Colin; various diagnoses, like ADHD, were made. When he was eight, he switched from his old school to the Kathedrale Koorschool Utrecht, where he got the chance to develop his musical talents. For a long time Kyteman was the precentor of the choir. He stopped singing at the age of fifteen.

After primary school Colin went to Secondary school for Young Talents, linked to the Royal Conservatory of The Hague, where he could specialize in playing the trumpet. The Royal Conservatory directly granted him special permission to go to their school, but after two years he also quit there.

Solo
At the age of eighteen, Colin moved to another part of Utrecht. He spent three years writing and recording his debut album The Hermit Sessions. After he completed the album, in 2009, he toured through Europe with his Kyteman's Hiphop Orchestra.

In October 2010 he played two songs with Sting, Desert Rose and All Would Envy.

Albums

Hermit Sessions 

The Hermit Sessions was released in 2009 and the music was described as a mix of hip-hop and jazz laced with tender melodies and raw beats. The album was a great success in the Netherlands; It has reached the top five of the Dutch Album Charts, sold over 75,000 copies, and has kept a position in the charts for more than two years.
With this album, they won all the major music prizes in the Netherlands.

The Kyteman Orchestra
The Kyteman Orchestra is a hip-hop group consisting of 18 musicians, opera singers and a choir. Benders described the group's sound as "a collection of sounds, somewhere between opera, hip-hop, drum & bass, electro, minimalism and all kinds of other genres that I can't even begin to describe."

The Kyteman Orchestra performed at Dutch festivals and stages, such as the North Sea Jazz Festival and A Campingflight to Lowlands Paradise.

References 

1988 births
Living people
Dutch hip hop musicians
Royal Conservatory of The Hague alumni